The 2018 Hong Kong Women's Sevens acted not only as a qualifier for the 2018–19 World Rugby Women's Sevens Series, but also for seeding purposes for the 2018 Rugby World Cup Sevens for five of the teams. The tournament was played on 5–6 April 2018 with pool stage matches played at So Kon Po Rec Ground with knock-out stage matches played at the Hong Kong Stadium in Hong Kong alongside the 2018 Hong Kong Sevens for men.

Continental qualifying 

Teams will qualify for the World Series Qualifier tournament based on continental championships. The top teams from each continent that are not already core teams will qualify. Teams in bold also qualified for the 2018 Rugby World Cup Sevens.

Format
12 teams, split into three groups of four. The group winners, runners up and the two best third ranked teams will enter the knockout stage. The overall winner will gain a spot on the 2018–19 World Rugby Women's Sevens series.

Pool Stage
All times in Hong Kong Time (UTC+08:00). The games as scheduled are as follows:

Pool X

Pool Y

Pool Z

Knockout stage

See also
2018 Hong Kong Sevens
2017-18 World Rugby Women's Sevens Series
2018 Rugby World Cup Sevens – Women's tournament

References

External links
 Tournament Page 

2018
2018 rugby sevens competitions
2018 in women's rugby union
Rugby union
2018 in Asian rugby union
Hong Kong Women's Sevens